Bayer Sportstadion, also known as the Stadion am Wollenhofweg, is a football stadium with an athletics facility in the Uerdingen district of Krefeld, North Rhine-Westphalia, Germany. Located within the Bayer Uerdingen sports park, it is owned and used by the SC Bayer 05 Uerdingen multi-sport club.

Adjacent to the stadium, and also within the sports park, is the Bayer Uerdingen Cricket Ground, part of Germany's national cricket performance centre, a joint venture between SC Bayer 05 Uerdingen and the German Cricket Federation.

References

Athletics (track and field) venues in Germany
Buildings and structures in Krefeld
Football venues in Germany
Sport in Krefeld
Sports venues in North Rhine-Westphalia